The Citroën Metropolis is a concept car, designed in China by Citroën and presented on the French pavilion of the Expo 2010 in Shanghai. The concept was unveiled in May 2010, though the first pictures were revealed a month earlier. 

The Citroën Metropolis is a long, four-door saloon featuring four seats, rear-hinged doors, an LCD navigator, long and low headlights, silver door handles and revised grille with Citroën's new logo. The vehicle was confirmed for production in October 2010, but was a further ten years before the DS 9 was revealed, for launch in 2021.

References

Metropolis
Rear-wheel-drive vehicles
Cars introduced in 2010
Executive cars
Sedans